The third Inter-Cities Fairs Cup was the first to be played over a single season, namely the 1960–61 season. Birmingham City once again reached the final, but lost again over two legs, this time to Roma. Once again, a number of countries sent a representative team for one of their main cities.

First round 

|}

1 Belgrade XI progressed to the Quarter finals after beating Leipzig XI 2–0 on a play-off match.

First leg

Second leg

Internazionale won 14–3 on aggregate.

Barcelona FC won 5–4  on aggregate.

Leipzig drew 6–6 with Belgrade XI on aggregate.

Beograd XI won the play-off 2–0.

KB won 11–4 on aggregate.

Birmingham City won 5–3 on aggregate.

Roma won 4–1 on aggregate.

Quarter-finals 

|}

1 Roma progressed to the Semifinals after beating Cologne XI 4–1 on a play-off match.

First leg

Second leg

Internazionale won 5–1 on aggregate.

Birmingham City won 9–4 on aggregate.

Hibernian won 7–6 on aggregate.

Roma 2–2 Cologne XI on aggregate.

Roma won 4–1 in play-off.

Semi-finals 

|}

1 Roma progressed to the Final after beating Hibernian 6–0 on a play-off match.

First leg

Second leg

Birmingham City won 4–2 on aggregate.

Roma 5–5 Hibernian on aggregate.

Roma won 6–0 in play-off.

Final

First leg

Second leg

Roma won 4–2 on aggregate.

External links 
 Inter-Cities Fairs Cup results at Rec.Sport.Soccer Statistics Foundation

2
Inter-Cities Fairs Cup seasons